Aleksandr Shirshov (born 25 August 1972) is a Russian fencer. He won a gold medal in the team sabre event at the 1992 Summer Olympics. He is now a fencing coach. 2013 World team champion Kamil Ibragimov is amongst his pupils.

References

External links
 
 
 Alexander Shirshov at the Russian Fencing Federation  (in English)
 

1972 births
Living people
Russian male fencers
Olympic fencers of the Unified Team
Fencers at the 1992 Summer Olympics
Olympic gold medalists for the Unified Team
Olympic medalists in fencing
Martial artists from Moscow
Medalists at the 1992 Summer Olympics
20th-century Russian people